Garra cyclostomata is a species of ray-finned fish in the genus Garra from Laos and Vietnam.

References 

Garra
Fish described in 1978